Gabriele Heinen-Kljajic (born 28 May 1962 in Gemünd) is a German politician for the Alliance '90/The Greens.

Political career
Heinen-Kljajic was elected to the Lower Saxon Landtag in 2003 state elections, and has been re-elected in 2008 and 2013. On February 19, 2013, she was sworn in as State Minister for Science and Culture in the government of Minister-President Stephan Weil. As one of her state's representatives at the Bundesrat, she served on the Committee on Cultural Affairs.

When the Green Party had to leave the coalition government following 2017 state elections, Heinen-Kljajic was succeeded by Björn Thümler.

Other activities
 Volkswagen Foundation, Chairwoman of the Board of Trustees
 Deutsches Museum, Member of the Board of Trustees
 Max Planck Institute for Biophysical Chemistry, Member of the Board of Trustees
 Max Planck Institute for Dynamics and Self-Organization, Member of the Board of Trustees
 Niedersächsische Staatstheater Hannover, Ex-Officio Chairwoman of the Supervisory Board (2013-2017)
 Staatstheater Braunschweig, Ex-Officio Chairwoman of the Supervisory Board (2013-2017)
 Oldenburgisches Staatstheater, Ex-Officio Chairwoman of the Supervisory Board (2013-2017)

References

1962 births
Living people
Alliance 90/The Greens politicians
Members of the Landtag of Lower Saxony
Women members of State Parliaments in Germany
Ministers of the Lower Saxony State Government
Women ministers of State Governments in Germany
21st-century German women politicians